Tom Juma (born 23 September 1976) is a Kenyan footballer. He played in 38 matches for the Kenya national football team from 1995 to 2005. He was a part of the team that famously upset Algeria 3–1 during 1998 FIFA World Cup qualification, and was also named in Kenya's squad for the 2004 African Cup of Nations tournament.

At the club level he was named player of the year in Kenya in 2001, prompting a move to Sweden.

Coaching career
He began his head coaching career at second-tier Kenyan side Administration Police in 2012. After two stints as interim head coach at Muhoroni Youth early in the 2016 season, he was finally given the permanent job in October of that year. The following year he joined A.F.C. Leopards as an assistant, but finished the year as caretaker after manager Dorian Marin was sacked.

References

External links
 
 

1976 births
Living people
Kenyan footballers
Kenyan football managers
Kenya international footballers
2004 African Cup of Nations players
Place of birth missing (living people)
Association football midfielders
A.F.C. Leopards players
Oserian F.C. players
Mjällby AIF players
Friska Viljor FC players
Husqvarna FF players
Superettan players
Ettan Fotboll players
Division 2 (Swedish football) players
Division 3 (Swedish football) players
Kenyan expatriate footballers
Kenyan expatriate sportspeople in Sweden
Expatriate footballers in Sweden